Danny Irmen (born September 6, 1984 in Fargo, North Dakota) is a retired American professional ice hockey right winger. He most recently played for ERC Ingolstadt of the Deutsche Eishockey Liga (DEL). Irmen was drafted 78th overall by the Minnesota Wild in the 2003 NHL Entry Draft, and played his only two NHL games with them.

Playing career
Irmen was drafted after playing two seasons in the United States Hockey League with the Lincoln Stars He played collegiate hockey with the University of Minnesota in the Western Collegiate Hockey Association. At the conclusion of his junior year, the North Dakota native made his professional debut with the Wild's American Hockey League affiliate, the Houston Aeros at the tail end of the 2005–06 season.

After signing an entry-level contract with the Minnesota Wild, Irmen was reassigned to the Aeros on a full-time basis. Irmen made his long-awaited NHL debut in his fifth year within the Wild organization, appearing in two games in the 2009–10 season.

As a free agent from the Wild, Irmen decided to pursue a European career, signing with Italian club, HC Bolzano of then the Serie A on October 12, 2010.

Irmen followed with stints in Austria and Switzerland before signing a one-year contract with German club, ERC Ingolstadt of the DEL on May 26, 2015. He would spend two seasons with them before retiring from professional hockey.

Career statistics

Awards and honors

References

External links

1984 births
American men's ice hockey right wingers
EHC Black Wings Linz players
Bolzano HC players
Houston Aeros (1994–2013) players
ERC Ingolstadt players
Lincoln Stars players
Living people
HC Lugano players
Minnesota Golden Gophers men's ice hockey players
Minnesota Wild draft picks
Minnesota Wild players
Sportspeople from Fargo, North Dakota
Ice hockey people from North Dakota